Ismail Merchant (born Ismail Noor Muhammad Abdul Rahman (25 December 1936 – 25 May 2005)) was an Indian film producer, director and screenwriter. He worked for many years in collaboration with Merchant Ivory Productions which included Director (and Merchant's longtime professional and domestic partner) James Ivory as well as screenwriter Ruth Prawer Jhabvala.

Early life and education 
Born in Bombay (Mumbai), Merchant was son of Hazra (née Memon) and Noor Mohamed Rehman, a Bombay textile dealer. He grew up bilingual in Gujarati and Urdu, and learned Arabic and English at school. When he was 11, he and his family were caught up in the 1947 partition of India. His father was the President of the Muslim League and refused to move to Pakistan. Merchant later said that he carried memories of "butchery and riots" into adulthood.
As a child at the age of 9, Merchant delivered a speech about partition at a political rally in front of a crowd of 10,000. At age 13, he developed a close friendship with actress Nimmi, who introduced him to studios in Bombay (the center of Hindi film industry). It was she who inspired his ambitious rise to stardom.
Merchant studied at St. Xavier's College, Mumbai and received BA degree of University of Bombay. It was here he developed a love for movies. When he was 22, he moved to  USA to study at New York University where he received an MBA degree. While in New York, he gave up his family name of Abdul Rehman for Merchant. He supported himself by working as a messenger for the UN in New York and used this opportunity to persuade Indian delegates to fund his film projects. Of this experience, he said, "I was not intimidated by anyone or anything." Immersed in a new world of art and culture, it was here that Merchant discovered the films of Bengali director Satyajit Ray, as well as those of European artists such as Ingmar Bergman, Vittorio De Sica, and Federico Fellini.
In 1961, Merchant made a short film, The Creation of Woman. It was shown at the Cannes Film Festival and received an Academy Award nomination.

Merchant Ivory Productions
Merchant met American movie director James Ivory at a screening in New York of Ivory's documentary The Sword and the Flute in 1959. In May 1961, Merchant and Ivory formed the film production company Merchant Ivory Productions. Merchant and Ivory were long-term life partners. Their professional and romantic partnership lasted 44 years, from 1961 until Merchant's death in 2005.
The Guinness Book of World Records says theirs was the longest partnership in independent cinema history. Until Merchant's death in 2005, they produced nearly 40 films, including a number of award winners. Novelist Ruth Prawer Jhabvala was the screenwriter for most of their productions.
In 1963, MIP premiered its first production, The Householder, based upon a novel by Jhabvala (who also wrote the screenplay). This feature became the first Indian-made film to be distributed internationally by a major American studio, Columbia Pictures. However, it wasn't until the 1970s that partnership "hit on a successful formula for studied, slow-moving pieces ... Merchant Ivory became known for their attention to tiny period detail and opulence of their sets". Their first success in this style was Jhabvala's adaptation of Henry James's The Europeans.
In addition to producing, Merchant directed a number of films and two TV features. For TV, he directed a short feature entitled Mahatma and the Mad Boy, and a full-length feature, The Courtesans of Bombay, made for Britain's Channel Four. Merchant made his film directorial debut with 1993's In Custody based on a novel by Anita Desai, and starring Bollywood actor Shashi Kapoor. Filmed in Bhopal, India, it won National Awards from the Government of India for Best Production Design and Special Jury award for lead actor Shashi Kapoor. His second directing feature, The Proprietor, starred Jeanne Moreau, Sean Young, Jean-Pierre Aumont and Christopher Cazenove and was filmed on location in Paris, France.
Of his partnership with Ivory and Jhabvala, Merchant once commented: "It is a strange marriage we have at Merchant Ivory ... I am an Indian Muslim, Ruth is a German Jew, and Jim is a Protestant American. Someone once described us as a three-headed god. Maybe they should have called us a three-headed monster!"

Cooking and writing
Merchant was fond of cooking, and he wrote several books including Ismail Merchant's Indian Cuisine, Ismail Merchant's Florence, Ismail Merchant's Passionate Meals, and Ismail Merchant's Paris: Filming and Feasting in France. He also wrote books on filmmaking, including a book about the making of the film The Deceivers in 1988 titled Hullabaloo in Old Jeypur, and another about the making of The Proprietor called Once Upon a Time ... The Proprietor. His last book was entitled My Passage from India: A Filmmaker's Journey from Bombay to Hollywood and Beyond.

Filmography

Director

Producer

Actor

Awards and nominations
In 2002 he was awarded the Padma Bhushan, the third-highest civilian award in the Republic of India.
He was also a recipient of The International Center in New York's Award of Excellence.

Academy Awards

British Academy Film Awards

Golden Globe Awards

Producers Guild of America Award

Death
Merchant died in Westminster, England aged 68, following surgery for abdominal ulcers. He was buried in Bada Qabrastan Mumbai in Marine Lines, Mumbai, India on 28 May 2005, in keeping with his wish to be buried with his ancestors.

References

Further reading
"Cheek of the devil, charm of an angel: Ismail Merchant, Producer, 1936–2005" (Obituary reprinted from Telegraph, London), in The Sydney Morning Herald, 2005-05-30, p. 41

External links

 
 
 Biography from Merchant-Ivory Productions
 Merchant was the driving force behind a slew of creative movies
 Ismail Merchant: In Memory 

1936 births
2005 deaths
St. Xavier's College, Mumbai alumni
Deaths from ulcers
Film producers from Mumbai
British film directors
British film producers
Indian food writers
British food writers
Indian Ismailis
British Ismailis
British people of Gujarati descent
New York University Stern School of Business alumni
Recipients of the Padma Bhushan in arts
Filmmakers who won the Best Film BAFTA Award
Indian emigrants to England
Naturalised citizens of the United Kingdom
LGBT film directors
Indian LGBT screenwriters
Indian LGBT rights activists
LGBT Muslims
Commandeurs of the Ordre des Arts et des Lettres
20th-century LGBT people
Khoja Ismailism